The discography of Hot Chocolate, a British disco and soul band.

Studio albums

Compilation albums

Singles

References

Notes

Sources

Discographies of British artists
Pop music group discographies
Rhythm and blues discographies
Disco discographies
Funk music discographies